An oxygen minimum zone (OMZ) is characterized as an oxygen-deficient layer in the world oceans. Typically found between 200m to 1500m deep below regions of high productivity, such as the western coasts of continents. OMZs can be seasonal following the spring-summer upwelling season. Upwelling of nutrient-rich water leads to high productivity and labile organic matter, that is respired by heterotrophs as it sinks down the water column. High respiration rates deplete the oxygen in the water column to concentrations of 2 mg/L or less forming the OMZ. OMZs are expanding, with increasing ocean deoxygenation. Under these oxygen-starved conditions, energy is diverted from higher trophic levels to microbial communities that have evolved to use other biogeochemical species instead of oxygen, these species include Nitrate, Nitrite, Sulphate etc. Several Bacteria and Archea have adapted to live in these environments by using these alternate chemical species and thrive.  The most abundant phyla in OMZs are Pseudomonadota, Bacteroidota, Actinomycetota, and Planctomycetota.

In the absence of oxygen, microbes use other chemical species to carry out respiration, in the order of the electrochemical series. With nitrate and nitrite reduction yielding as much energy as oxygen respiration, followed by manganese and iodate respiration and yielding the least amount of energy at the bottom of the series are the iron and sulfate reducers. the utilization of these chemical species by microbes plays an important role in their biogeochemical cycling in the world's oceans.

Life in Anoxic Conditions

Nitrogen Cycling 
Biological productivity (photosynthesis) in marine ecosystems is often limited by the bioavailability of nitrogen. The amount of bioavailable nitrogen (nitrate (NO3−), nitrite (NO2−), and ammonium (NH4+)) depends on the inputs from nitrogen fixation and losses from denitrification and anammox as dinitrogen gas (N2), a compound only accessible to nitrogen-fixing bacteria. N2 production from denitrification and anammox closes the nitrogen cycle by reducing the nitrogen available in organic matter fixed by phytoplankton at the surface ocean. Denitrification in OMZs leads to a significant loss of inorganic nitrogen from the oceans, limiting growth/productivity in many regions around the world. OMZs are known for their role in the global nitrogen cycle. As no oxygen is present to fuel aerobic respiration, anoxic systems are primarily dominated by microbially-mediated nitrogen cycling.

N2 fixation is performed by diazotrophs (N2 fixing bacteria and archaea), which convert N2 gas into ammonia (NH3). The amount of N2 fixation and the distribution of diazotrophs in the ocean is determined by the availability of oxygen (O2), light, phosphorus (P), iron (Fe), and organic matter, as well as habitat temperature. N2 fixation has been found in some anoxic systems, generally associated with sulfate reducers or oxidizers. However, heterotrophic denitrification is a more dominant process under anoxic conditions. Denitrification is the reduction of NO3− and NO2− to the gaseous form of nitrogen (N2), including the greenhouse gas nitrous oxide (N2O). Heterotrophic denitrification is a multi-step process that uses organic matter to reduce NO3−  to N2 in oxygen-depleted environments like OMZs and sediments. In OMZs, different steps in the denitrification processes are performed by separate groups of bacteria, and these denitrifiers are often found directly on sinking organic matter particles, which are hotspots of microbial activity. The first step of denitrification is nitrate reduction where NO3− is reduced to NO2− by the protein nitrate reductase. Anaerobic ammonia-oxidizing bacteria (anammox) convert NO2− and NH4+ to N2 using an enzyme called hydrazine oxidoreductase. Genomic studies conducted in these ecosystems reveal a growing abundance of the genes encoding for the proteins responsible for the dissimilatory nitrate reduction to ammonium (DNRA) and anammox at the core of these OMZs. Such studies provide information to map out the nitrogen cycle and demystify missing links and unexplored pathways in the water column. Anammox is often coupled to denitrification as a source of NH4+ in OMZs or to DNRA in sediments. DNRA has been found to be the dominant process supplying NH4+ near the shelf and upper slope of sediments because of the presence of large bacterial mats made up of the giant sulfur-oxidizing bacteria Thioploca spp. and Beggiatoa spp. which reduce NO3− and/or NO2− to NH4+ using reduced sulfur. Denitrification and anammox account for about 30-50% of the N losses in OMZs, where the total N loss determined by the supply of sinking organic matter available.

Additionally, ammonium and nitrite oxidation are key processes in N cycling in anoxic environments. Ammonium oxidation is the first step in nitrification and ammonia-oxidizing bacteria (AOB) converts NH3 to NO2−. Followed by nitrite oxidation by nitrite-oxidizing bacteria (NOB), which converts NO2− to NO3−. Ammonium and nitrite oxidizers have a high affinity for O2 and can use nanomolar concentrations of O2 to oxidize ammonium and nitrite. These small concentrations of O2 can be supplied by photosynthesis by Prochlorococcus spp. or by horizontal mixing by jets and eddies. In anoxic environments, the competition between ammonium and nitrite oxidization and anammox and denitrification for ammonium and nitrite play an important role in controlling nitrogen loss in OMZs.

Sources of ammonium for anammox bacteria 
Anaerobic ammonium oxidation with nitrite (anammox) is a major pathway of fixed nitrogen removal in the anoxic zones of the open ocean. Anammox requires a source of ammonium, which under anoxic conditions could be supplied by the breakdown of sinking organic matter via heterotrophic denitrification. However, at many locations where anammox is observed, denitrification rates are small or undetectable. Alternative sources of NH4+ than denitrification, such as the DNRA, the diffusion and advection from sulfate-reducing sediments, or from microaerobic remineralization at the boundaries of anoxic waters, can supply NH4+ to anammox bacterial communities, even though it is not yet clear how much they can influence the process. Another source of NH4+, which plays an important role in the N cycle of OMZs by contributing to the decoupling of anammox and denitrification, is the excretion of NH4+ by diel vertically migrating animals. To escape predation, diel vertical migration (DVM) of zooplankton and micronekton can reach the anoxic layers of the major OMZs of the open ocean, and because animals excrete reduced N mostly as NH4+, they can fuel anammox directly and decouple it from denitrification. The downward export of organic matter by migrating zooplankton and micronekton is generally smaller than that of particles at the base of the euphotic zone. However, sinking particles are rapidly consumed with depth, and the active transport by migrators can exceed particle remineralization in deeper layers where animals congregate during the daytime. As a result, inside anoxic waters the excretion of NH4+ by vertically migrating animals could alter the balance between fixed N removal pathways, decoupling anammox and denitrification and enhancing anammox above the values predicted by typical stoichiometry.

Methanogenesis 

Methanogenesis is the process by which methanogen microbes form methane (CH4). OMZs are known to contain the largest amount of methane in the open ocean. Methanogens can also oxidize methane as they have the genes to do so, however this requires oxygen which they obtain from photosynthetic organisms in the upper anoxic zone. Ciliates may also aid methanogens through symbiosis to help facilitate methanogenesis. As ciliates have hydrogenosomes, which release hydrogen molecules under low oxygen conditions, they have the ability to host endosymbiotic methanogens.

Sulfate Reduction 
Sulfate reduction, which occurs with the help of sulfate-reducing microorganisms, is used in the cryptic sulfur cycle. This cycle is continuous oxidation and reduction of sulfate and uses sulfate as the terminal electron acceptor rather than oxygen. The cycle was purposed to help contribute to the energy flow to anoxic water off the coast of Chile.

Aerobic Microbial Respiration 
Aerobic organisms require oxygen to survive and as oxygen becomes limited in OMZs bacteria begin to use other molecules to oxidize organic matter such as nitrate. Aerobic respiration in OMZs helps remineralize organic matter and is a major source of ammonium for most of the upper oxygen minimal zones. It was also found that bacteria from OMZs use a 1/6 of the oxygen for respiration compared bacteria in normal waters.

Climate Change 
While OMZs can occur naturally, they can be exacerbated by human impacts like climate change and land-based pollution from agriculture and sewage. The prediction of current climate models is substantial warming and loss of oxygen throughout the majority of the upper ocean. Global warming increases ocean temperatures, especially in shallow coastal areas, and when water temperature increases, its ability to hold oxygen decreases, leading to oxygen concentrations going down in the water. Nutrients found in both agricultural runoff and sewage can contribute to excessive primary production, creating a bloom, that introduces large quantities of organic carbon which accumulates on the seafloor. This organic carbon is then broken down through respiration, using up the available oxygen in the water.

Open ocean areas with no oxygen have grown more than 1.7 million square miles in the last 50 years, and coastal waters have seen a tenfold increase in low-oxygen areas in the same time. Consequences of even a small decrease in oxygen levels can hinder reproduction, growth, and can lead to disease and death in marine animals.  If there is enough decrease of oxygen in the water, it could become unlivable for the majority of the organisms living there, resulting in what are commonly called dead zones.

Short term effects can be seen in acutely fatal circumstances, but other sublethal consequences can include impaired reproductive ability, reduced growth, and increase in diseased population. These can be attributed to the co-stressor effect. When an organism is already stressed, for example getting less oxygen than it would prefer, it doesn't do as well in other areas of its existence like reproduction, growth, and warding off disease. Additionally, warmer water not only holds less oxygen, but it also causes marine organisms to have higher metabolic rates, resulting in them using up available oxygen more quickly, lowering the oxygen concentration in the water even more and compounding the effects seen. Finally, for some organisms, habitat reduction will be a problem. Habitable zones in the water column are expected to compress and habitable seasons are expected to be shortened. If the water an organism's regular habitat sits in has oxygen concentrations lower than it can tolerate, it won't want to live there anymore. This leads to changed migration patterns as well as changed or reduced habitat area.

Long term effects can be seen on a broader scale of changes in biodiversity and food web makeup. Due to habitat change of many organisms, predator-prey relationships will be altered. For example, when squeezed into a smaller well-oxygenated area, predator-prey encounter rates will increase, causing an increase in predation, potentially putting strain on the prey population.  Additionally, diversity of ecosystems in general is expected to decrease due to decrease in oxygen concentrations.

See also
 Ocean deoxygenation
 Anoxic event
 Anoxic waters
 Dead zone (ecology)
 Ocean acidification

References 

Environmental microbiology
Biological oceanography